Charles Swan may refer to:

 Charles Swan (pirate) (died 1690), reluctant buccaneer
 Charles Swan (cricketer), former Bermudian cricketer
 Charles Sheridan Swan (1831–1879), co-founder of British shipbuilding firm Swan Hunter

See also
Charlie Swan (disambiguation)
A Glimpse Inside the Mind of Charles Swan III, a 2012 American film